School District 99 may refer to:
 Christopher School District 99
 Cicero Public School District 99
 Community High School District 99 (DuPage County, Illinois)
 Nashville Community High School District 99
 Spring Valley Elementary School District 99